This is a list of the mammal species recorded in Andorra. There are seventeen mammal species in Andorra, of which two are vulnerable and one is near threatened.

The following tags are used to highlight each species' conservation status as assessed by the International Union for Conservation of Nature:

Order: Artiodactyla (even-toed ungulates) 

The even-toed ungulates are ungulates whose weight is borne about equally by the third and fourth toes, rather than mostly or entirely by the third as in perissodactyls. There are about 220 artiodactyl species, including many that are of great economic importance to humans.
Family: Suidae (pigs)
Subfamily: Suinae
Genus: Sus
 Wild boar, S. scrofa 
Family: Cervidae (deer)
Subfamily: Cervinae
Genus: Cervus
Red deer, C. elaphus 
Genus: Dama
 Fallow deer, D. dama  introduced
Subfamily: Capreolinae
Genus: Capreolus
 Roe deer, C. capreolus 
Family: Bovidae (bovids)
Genus: Bison
European bison, B. bonasus 
Subfamily: Caprinae
Pyrenean chamois, Rupicapra pyrenaica

Order: Perissodactyla (odd-toed ungulates)
The odd-toed ungulates are browsing and grazing mammals. They are usually large to very large, and have relatively simple stomachs and a large middle toe.

Family: Equidae (horses etc.)
Genus: Equus
 Wild horse, E. ferus  reintroduced

Order: Carnivora (carnivorans) 

There are over 260 species of carnivorans, the majority of which feed primarily on meat. They have a characteristic skull shape and dentition. 
Suborder: Feliformia
Family: Felidae (cats)
Subfamily: Felinae
Genus: Felis
 European wildcat, F. silvestris 
Genus: Lynx
 Eurasian lynx, L. lynx 
Family: Viverridae
Subfamily: Viverrinae
Genus: Genetta
 Common genet, G. genetta  introduced
Suborder: Caniformia
Family: Canidae (dogs, foxes)
Golden jackal, C. aureus   vagrant
 Gray wolf, C. lupus 
 Eurasian wolf, C. l. lupus
Genus: Vulpes
 Red fox, V. vulpes 
Family: Mustelidae (mustelids, weasels and stoats)
Genus: Mustela
 Least weasel, M. nivalis LC
 European polecat, M. putorius LC
 Stoat, M. erminea LC
Genus: Lutra
 European otter, L. lutra 
Genus: Meles
 European badger, M. meles 
Family: Ursidae (bears)
Genus: Ursus
 Brown bear, U. arctos  presence uncertain
 Eurasian brown bear, U. a. arctos

Order: Chiroptera (bats) 

The bats' most distinguishing feature is that their forelimbs are developed as wings, making them the only mammals capable of flight. Bat species account for about 20% of all mammals.
Family: Vespertilionidae
Subfamily: Myotinae
Genus: Myotis
 Greater mouse-eared bat, M. myotis 
Subfamily: Vespertilioninae
Genus: Barbastella
 Western barbastelle, B. barbastellus
Genus: Nyctalus
 Lesser noctule, N. leisleri 
Genus: Plecotus
Brown long-eared bat, P. auritus 
Family: Rhinolophidae
Subfamily: Rhinolophinae
Genus: Rhinolophus
 Lesser horseshoe bat, R. hipposideros LC

Order: Lagomorpha (hares and rabbits) 
Family: Leporidae
Genus: Lepus
 European hare, L. europaeus 
Genus: Oryctolagus
 European rabbit, O. cuniculus

Order: Rodentia (rodents) 
Rodents make up the largest order of mammals, with over 40 percent of mammalian species. They have two incisors in the upper and lower jaw which grow continually and must be kept short by gnawing.
Suborder: Castorimorpha
Family: Castoridae (beavers)
Subfamily: Castorinae
Tribe: Castorini
Genus: Castor
 Eurasian beaver, C. fiber 
Suborder: Myomorpha
Family: Cricetidae
Subfamily: Arvicolinae
Genus: Microtus
 Field vole, Microtus agrestis LC
 Common vole, Microtus arvalis LC
Family: Sciuridae
Subfamily: Xerinae
Genus: Marmota
Alpine marmot, M. marmota LC introduced
Family: Muridae (mice, rats, gerbils, etc.)
Subfamily: Murinae
Genus: Apodemus
 Yellow-necked mouse, Apodemus flavicollis LC
 Wood mouse, Apodemus sylvaticus LC

Order: Soricomorpha (shrews, moles, and solenodons) 

The "shrew-forms" are insectivorous mammals. The shrews and solenodons closely resemble mice while the moles are stout-bodied burrowers.

Family: Talpidae (moles)
Subfamily: Talpinae
Genus: Talpa
 European mole, T. europaea LC
Genus: Galemys
 Pyrenean desman, G. pyrenaicus

See also

List of chordate orders
List of prehistoric mammals
Mammal classification
List of mammals described in the 2000s

References

External links

Andorra
Mammals
Mammals
Andorra